Harvey Goldman (born September 28, 1951) is an American artist and educator.

Education 
He received his BFA from the University of Illinois at Urbana–Champaign and his MFA from the University of Massachusetts, Amherst.

Career
Goldman is best known for his work in the fields of ceramics, digital art, experimental film and visual music.
 
Goldman's work is represented among many private and public art collections including the IotaCenter for Experimental Animation, Boston Museum of Fine Arts, Everson Museum of Art,
 DeCordova Museum and Sculpture Park]], Currier Museum of Art, and the Crocker Art Museum. 
Goldman's work has been exhibited in a wide range of venues throughout the United States as well as Amsterdam, Austria, Australia, Britain, Canada, China, France, Germany, Israel, Italy, Spain, Romania, Russia, South Africa, and Turkey. He is the recipient of grants from the National Endowment for the Arts (Emerging Craftsman Award), The Ford Foundation and the Massachusetts Council on the Arts and Humanities. Goldman taught at the University of Massachusetts, Dartmouth from 1978-2015.

Ceramics 
Goldman's work in the area of ceramics ranges from approximately 1973–1987.
The work is characterized by asymmetrical organic forms and rich multi-fired surfaces that reflect the effects of time and aging. The work has been acquired by both private and public collections. His vessel "Wolley Zuff" was featured in Peter Lanes book Studio Ceramics and on the cover of American Ceramics Magazine. Goldman's ceramic work has been featured in many issues of Ceramics Monthly Magazine

He has taught ceramic workshops at both the Penland School of Crafts and the Haystack Mountain School of Crafts.

Digital Imaging
Goldman's work in the area of digital imaging can be characterized by a rich use of the color, pattern and texture as well as a multi-layering of photographic elements.

Art historian Dr. Thomas Stubblefield, has stated,"Utilizing digital photography to carefully layer graphic elements of the natural world, Goldman’s images blur the boundaries between still and moving images, painting and photography, realism and fantasy. These tensions form the basis of his Veiled Ancestors and Coincidentia Oppositorum series, a body of work that originates from the vast catalogue of photographs that the artist has collected from his daily walks in the woods. In this work the camera is called upon not to suspend or freeze time but to expand its reach, accumulating multiple moments within its frame" and "In his Extremities and Digits series, Goldman interrogates the inner workings of his primary tool, the hand. Despite never actually disclosing the artist himself, the work comprises a self-portrait of sorts. It is a meditation on the mystery of the creative process and the interconnectedness between the artist’s identity and his daily work."

Experimental animation and visual music 
Goldman's work in the field of animation can be catalogued under the categories of experimental film and visual music. Goldman"s work have been displayed in film festivals worldwide, including, the Smithsonian's Hirshhorn Museum and Sculpture Garden, the Corcoran Gallery of Art the White Box Museum, Beijing, China, and MuVi4, in conjunction with the Fifth International conference; Synaesthesia: Science and Art, Alcalà la Real, Jaèn, Spain. His animation "Sabinium" was created in collaboration with composer Ken Ueno. "Brahmanda", "Enigma" and "Passaddhi" have been created in collaboration with Chinese composer Jing Wang.

References

External links
 Harvey Goldman website
 Lapham's Quarterly
 Big Red and Shiny Article
 Arts Habens

Living people
American artists
1951 births
University of Massachusetts Amherst alumni